Aposelemis Dam is an earthen embankment dam on the Aposelemis River near the villages of Potamies and Avdou,  southeast of Heraklion, Greece. The dam is the largest water management project in Crete. It creates Aposelemis lake, a reservoir that serves as the primary fresh water supply for the cities of Heraklion and Agios Nikolaos plus 6 smaller municipalities and 19 communities along the touristically developed north coast of Crete with a combined population of 300,000 inhabitants.

History

The first thoughts to build a dam for providing water from Aposelemis date back to the 1970s. During the 1980s and 90s several preparatory studies were completed and the definitive construction study was approved in 2000. Despite strong opposition by the local communities in the early 2000s, the overwhelming need for water during the summer prevailed. The construction contract was put out to tender on 14/12/2004 and was awarded on 1/4/2005. Dam construction was completed in 2012 and accompanying works in early 2019. Total costs, including compensations for expropriation, exceeded 220 million euros.

The hamlet of Sfendyli was located inside the dam reservoir and below the filling level, therefore it had to be abandoned. During the dry years that followed the dam completion, Sfendyli sunk and re-emerged several times, becoming a local attraction.

Construction details
The Aposelemis dam is of rock-fill type with an impervious clay core.
The spillway is 231 m long with a maximum capacity of 1000 m3/sec. Hence, the dam additionally serves flood control purposes. The dam overflowed for the first time in February 2019.

See also
Kofini dam

References

External links
Info about the dam from Space-O
Φράγμα Αποσελέμη from Crete Development Organization

Dams in Greece
Buildings and structures in Heraklion (regional unit)
Landforms of Heraklion (regional unit)
Embankment dams